Global Forest Watch (GFW) is an open-source web application to monitor global forests in near real-time.  GFW is an initiative of the World Resources Institute (WRI), with partners including Google, USAID, the University of Maryland (UMD), Esri, Vizzuality and many other academic, non-profit, public, and private organizations.

History 
Global Forest Watch originally began in 1997 as an initiative to establish a global forest monitoring network, convened by the World Resources Institute and partners.

The initiative was rebooted in 2013 with data from the Center for Global Development derived from NASA's MODIS sensor, with additional layers subsequently added from Google/UMD, Imazon, Terra-i, and NASA. The second iteration of GFW was released in February 2014, and continues to add information at multiple time scales and spatial resolutions to track deforestation.  The GFW Commodities and GFW Fires sub-pages were subsequently released.

Use cases 
The GFW platform has been used in a number of notable applications.  The forest change data have been used to measure global deforestation rates and to detect and monitor illegal clearing activity, primarily in Indonesia. The NASA Active Fires data, displayed within GFW Fires, have been used to identify illegal burning that has caused the 2015 Southeast Asian haze crisis (see Haze crisis). Multinational companies use the GFW platform to track their supply chain, purportedly ensuring that they meet "no deforestation" commitments.

Data sets 

There are currently five categories of data sets available on the GFW site, which are updated at various frequencies and available at various spatial resolutions.

Forest Change Data 
 Brazilian Amazon SAD alerts
 Near-global QUICC alerts 
 Humid tropics FORMA alerts
 Tree cover gain
 Latin America Terra-i alerts
 Tree cover loss 
 NASA Active Fires
 Guatemala Forest Change 2001-2010 
 USA land cover change 2001 to 2011

Forest Cover Data 
 Tropical forest carbon stocks (2000)
 Indonesia primary forest (2000)
 Indonesia peat lands (2002)
 Indonesia land cover (2006) 
 Mangrove forests
 Tree cover (2000)
 Intact Forest Landscapes (2000)
 Brazilian Amazon SAD alerts 
 USA Land Cover (2011)
 Global Land Cover
 Cameroon Forest Management Units
 Guatemala Forest Cover 
 Romania tree cover

Forest Use Data 
 Logging concessions (select countries) 
 Wood fiber concessions (select countries) 
 Mining concessions (select countries) 
 Oil palm concessions (select countries)
 Eucalyptus concessions (select countries)
 Major dams
 Forest titles (select countries)

Conservation Data 
 Tiger Conservation Landscapes 
 Terai Arc Landscape Corridors 
 Indonesia forest moratorium
 Biodiversity hotspots
 Alliance for Zero Extinction Sites
 Protected areas 
 Endemic Bird Areas
 Indonesia oil palm suitability standard

People Data 
 Resource rights (select countries) 
 Indigenous lands (select countries) 
 Population density (2000)

Haze crisis 
GFW contributed notable data and analysis to reporting on the 2015 Southeast Asian haze crisis, including revealing that approximately 35% of the fires in Indonesia occurred in agricultural concessions. This reporting linked the forest fires to specific companies.

Awards 
 Computerworld Editors' Choice Award (2015)
 United Nations Big Data Climate Challenge (2014)
 Boreal Award, GFW Canada (2010)

References

Deforestation